The Trapezium or Orion Trapezium Cluster, also known by its Bayer designation of Theta1 Orionis, is a tight open cluster of stars in the heart of the Orion Nebula, in the constellation of Orion. It was discovered by Galileo Galilei. On 4 February 1617 he sketched three of the stars (A, C and D), but missed the surrounding nebulosity. A fourth component (B) was identified by several observers in 1673, and several more components were discovered later like E, for a total of eight by 1888. Subsequently, several of the stars were determined to be binaries. Telescopes of amateur astronomers from about  aperture can resolve six stars under good seeing conditions.

The Trapezium is a relatively young cluster that has formed directly out of the parent nebula. The five brightest stars are on the order of 15 to 30 solar masses in size. They are within a diameter of 1.5 light-years of each other and are responsible for much of the illumination of the surrounding nebula. The Trapezium may be a sub-component of the larger Orion Nebula Cluster, a grouping of about 2,000 stars within a diameter of 20 light-years.

Identification 
The Trapezium is most readily identifiable by the asterism of four relatively bright stars for which it is named. The four are often identified as A, B, C and D in order of increasing right ascension. The brightest of the four stars is C, or Theta1 Orionis C, with an apparent magnitude of 5.13. Both A and B have been identified as eclipsing binaries.

Infrared images of the Trapezium are better able to penetrate the surrounding clouds of dust, and have located many more stellar components. About half the stars within the cluster have been found to contain evaporating circumstellar disks, a likely precursor to planetary formation. In addition, brown dwarfs and low-mass runaway stars have been identified.

Possible black hole 
A 2012 paper suggests an intermediate-mass black hole with a mass more than 100 times that of the Sun may be present within the Trapezium, something that could explain the large velocity dispersion of the stars of the cluster.

References

Further reading

External links

 Chandra Observatory Uncovers Hot Stars In The Making, MIT Press Release, 2000.
 Astronomy Picture of the Day - In the Center of the Trapezium 2003 March 2
 Observing the Trapezium

Open clusters
Orion (constellation)
Orion molecular cloud complex
Orionis, Theta1
Asterisms (astronomy)
BD-05 1315
Orionis, 41